Liebknecht Bridge (German: Liebknechtbrücke) is a bridge in Berlin, Germany.

References

External links
 

Bridges in Berlin